Kappanamangalam  is a village in the Kudavasal taluk of Tiruvarur district in Tamil Nadu, India.

Demographics 

As per the 2001 census, Kappanamangalam had a population of 1,777 with 902 males and 875 females. The sex ratio was 970. The literacy rate was 75.18.

References 

 

Villages in Tiruvarur district